Alice Lee is the name of:

Alice Lee (actress) (born 1989), Korean-American actress
Alice Lee (chess player) (born 2009), American chess player
Alice Lee (civic leader) (1854–1943), civic leader in San Diego
Alice Lee (mathematician) (1858–1939), British mathematician, one of the first women to graduate from London University
Alice Lee (poet) (1883–1943), Chinese activist, writer, newspaper editor, poet and school founder
Alice Hathaway Lee Roosevelt (1861–1884), American socialite and first wife of President Theodore Roosevelt